Lucrezia Stefanini (born 15 May 1998) is an Italian tennis player.

She has career-high WTA rankings by No. 140 in singles and No. 393 in doubles.

Career

2021: WTA debut
Stefanini made her WTA Tour debut at the Abu Dhabi Open, qualifying for the main draw by defeating Irina Fetecău in the final qualifying round.

2022: Top 150 debut

2023: Grand Slam debut and first win
She made her major debut at the Australian Open. She recorded her first win at this level, defeating Tatjana Maria.

Performance timeline

Singles

ITF Circuit finals

Singles: 12 (7 titles, 5 runner-ups)

Doubles: 6 (2 titles, 4 runner–ups)

Notes

References

External links
 

1998 births
Living people
Italian female tennis players
People from Carmignano